Pippo Starnazza (16 April 1909 – 16 July 1975) was an Italian jazz singer and actor.

Born Luigi Redaelli in Milan, he started his career in the 1920s, playing the drums in the De Carli Orchestra at the Orfeo music hall in Milan. After having been part of several other orchestras and jazz bands, in the early 1930s Redaelli started his solo career as a singer, specializing in creating humorous covers of popular American songs in Milanese dialect. In 1939, he adopted his stage name and formed the Quintetto del Delirio (Delirium Quintet), with whom he sang cover songs where the English lyrics were replaced by an onomatopoeic, gibberish language. Beginning the 1960s, he appeared in many films in supporting and character roles. He died of cardiac arrest at the age of sixty-six.

References

1909 births
1975 deaths
Italian jazz drummers
Italian jazz singers
Italian male film actors
Italian male television actors
Male actors from Milan
Musicians from Milan
20th-century Italian male singers